Skin is a Netflix documentary produced by British-Nigerian actress Naraya Beverly to explore the gap between fair skinned ladies and dark skinned in Africa.  Colorism, unlike racism means discrimination of people based on skin shades and is prevalent among people of the same ethnic or racial group. The documentary was setup in Lagos to learn about contrasting perceptions of beauty from individuals who have gone through discrimination due to color of their skins.

Synopsis 
Skin is directed by Daniel Etim Effiong an hour long documentary that covers stories from Nigerian black women that have experience harsh treatment due to their skin colors. In many parts of Africa, light skinned ladies are used to be found more attractive than dark skinned and usually have tendency to get selected in areas such as entertainment, marketing and tourism industries. Eventually, the documentary turns to topics about how African/Nigerian women are obsessed with bleaching.

So many professionals were interviewed in this documentary ranging from doctors to celebrities and photographers. A contrasting moment is the meeting with Bobrisky.

References 

Television shows set in Lagos